Louise Wilhelmine Emilie, Countess von Bose, born Countess von Reichenbach-Lessonitz (1813–1883) was a benefactress of the poor and patron of the arts and sciences, particularly the natural sciences.  She was the oldest of eight children of Wilhelm II of Hesse-Kassel and his second wife Countess Emilie of Reichenbach-Lessonitz.  Louise was a favorite of her father who, it is said, appreciated her intelligence and loving, happy nature.

Biography 
She married Carl August, Count von Bose (1814-1887) in 1845 and the couple lived in Frankfurt, Wiesbaden and Baden-Baden.  Louise inherited a vast fortune from her mother, Emilie, Countess von Reichenbach-Lessonitz, the daughter of gold merchant Johann Christian Ortlöpp. The estate was valued at 48 million marks at the time of her death, an amount equivalent to billions of dollars in today's economy, and was divided equally among Louise and her six surviving siblings.

Count and Countess von Bose established numerous foundations, including a grant of 733,500 goldmarks to Humboldt University, Berlin's oldest institution of higher learning.  The endowment was to be used for medical research, both through scholarships to medical students, and for travel grants and assistance to active physicians.  Count and Countess von Bose provided substantial funding for the education of underprivileged and neglected children in Kassel, Louise's childhood home, and established The Children's Hospital of Brabant (destroyed in 1943), which cared for Hessian teachers, widows and orphans.  They were benefactors of the Senckenberg Natural Research Society in Frankfurt, and the Countess Louise von Bose Foundation funded the creation of the Dental Institute at the University of Marburg.  The Bose Museum on Luisenstrasse (Louise Street) in Kassel is named for her, as is the girls' school (Luisenschule) she established in 1855, and which remains active today.

The Louise von Bose Foundation passed to the city of Kassel upon her death, and included her extensive art collection, which later formed the core of the New Gallery collection, along with other personal mementos, furniture and documents.

Ancestry

External links
Bose Memorial and Museum
Louise von Bose at German Wikipedia
The Bose Foundation and its impact on the development of the Dental Institute in Marburg
Humboldt University Article on Louise von Bose
Louise School (Luisenschule)

German countesses
Louise
Humboldt University of Berlin
1813 births
1883 deaths
Daughters of monarchs